This is a list of individuals and events related to Tajikistan in 2023.

Incumbents

Events 

 February 15 – Around 10 people are killed in avalanches in Tajikistan.

See also 

 Outline of Tajikistan
 Index of Tajikistan-related articles
 List of Tajikistan-related topics
 History of Tajikistan

References

Further reading 

 
 

 
Tajikistan
Tajikistan
Years of the 21st century in Tajikistan